Markus Karlsson (born May 3, 1988) in Falun, Sweden, is a retired Swedish professional ice hockey defenceman who played for Färjestads BK of the Elitserien.

References

External links
 

Living people
Färjestad BK players
1988 births
Swedish ice hockey defencemen